Ernst Köpf Sr. (born 10 February 1940 in Füssen, Nazi Germany) is an ice hockey player who played for the West German national team. He won a bronze medal at the 1976 Winter Olympics.

His son Ernst Köpf Jr. competed in ice hockey at the 1992 Winter Olympics.

References

External links

1940 births
Living people
Augsburger Panther players
EV Füssen players
Ice hockey players at the 1964 Winter Olympics
Ice hockey players at the 1968 Winter Olympics
Ice hockey players at the 1976 Winter Olympics
Medalists at the 1976 Winter Olympics
Olympic bronze medalists for West Germany
Olympic medalists in ice hockey
Olympic ice hockey players of the United Team of Germany
Olympic ice hockey players of West Germany
Sportspeople from Füssen
West German ice hockey forwards
German ice hockey forwards